The 3"/21 caliber gun (spoken "three-inch-twenty-one-caliber") was a field gun for United States Navy and United States Marine Corps. They were a simple horse-drawn artillery gun that were mostly used by the Marines. The guns have also been described as Boat Guns but information on type of mounts has not been found.

Description
The Mark 1 was intended as a support gun for landing operations. It was of simple monobloc construction with a Fletcher breech mechanism with down swinging carrier, and used a hydraulic recoil piston that was screwed onto the gun directly.

Surviving pieces
Guns No. 5 and 6, built in 1875, had been restored and were located in St. Clair, Pennsylvania as of 2004.

References 

Naval guns of the United States
76 mm artillery
Artillery of the United States